Hemidactylus vijayraghavani is a species of gecko. It is endemic to Karnataka in India. It is a small, fairly stout gecko. The male holotype measures  and female paratype  in snout–vent length.

References

Hemidactylus
Reptiles described in 2018
Endemic fauna of India
Reptiles of India